Robert Cadee (born 27 August 1950) is an Australian former professional basketball player and coach.

Biography
Cadee played for the Australia men's national basketball team during the 1970s and competed for Australia at the 1976 Olympic Games held in Montreal. He played in the National Basketball League for the St. Kilda Saints and Bankstown Bruins. Cadee won an NBL championship with the Saints in 1979. He served as a player-coach of the Bruins during the 1983 season and won the NBL Coach of the Year Award.

After his playing career ended, Cadee went on to become a coach, leading the Opals from 1986 to 1992. 

Cadee's son, Jason, plays in the National Basketball League (NBL) for the Sydney Kings while his wife Debbie (formerly Debbie Lee) represented the Opals at the 1984 Olympics in Los Angeles.

References

1950 births
Living people
Australian men's basketball coaches
Australian men's basketball players
Basketball players at the 1976 Summer Olympics
Basketball players from Melbourne
Olympic basketball players of Australia
Southern Melbourne Saints players